The Abbasid dynasty or Abbasids were an Arab dynasty that ruled the Abbasid Caliphate between 750 and 1258. They were from the Qurayshi Hashimid clan of Banu Abbas, descended from Abbas ibn Abd al-Muttalib. The Abbasid Caliphate is divided into three main periods: Early Abbasid era (750–861), Middle Abbasid era (861–936) and Later Abbasid era (936–1258). A cadet branch of the dynasty also ruled as ceremonial rulers for the Mamluk Sultanate as Caliph (1261–1517), until their conquest by the Ottoman Empire.

Ancestry

The Abbasids descended from Abbas, one of Muhammad's companions (as well as his uncle) and one of the early Qur'an scholars. Therefore, their roots trace back to Hashim ibn 'Abd Manaf and also Adnan in the following line: Al-‘Abbas ibn Abdul-Muttalib ibn Hashim ibn Abd Manaf ibn Qusai ibn Kilab ibn Murrah ibn Ka'b ibn Lu'ay ibn Ghalib ibn Fihr ibn Malik ibn An-Nadr ibn Kinanah ibn Khuzaima ibn Mudrikah ibn Ilyas ibn Mudar ibn Nizar ibn Ma'add ibn Adnan.

Notable members
Abu'l-Abbas al-Saffah, the first caliph of the Abbasid Caliphate
Abu Ja'far Abdallah ibn Muhammad al-Mansur, the second Abbasid Caliph
Al-Mahdi third Abbasid caliph (r. October 775 – 24 July 785) was the most influential Abbasid Caliph. He also promoted Art and science in the Islamic Caliphate.
Al-Hadi, (r. 785–786) was an Abbasid caliph. He very open to the people of his empire and allowed citizens to visit him in the palace at Baghdad to address him. As such, he was considered an enlightened ruler.
Harun al-Rashid, fifth Abbasid caliph (r. 786–809) rule is traditionally regarded to be the height of Islamic Golden Age's power. He established the legendary library Bayt al-Hikma ("House of Wisdom") in Baghdad and during his rule Baghdad began to flourish as a world center of knowledge, culture and trade.
Al-Amin, (r. 809–813) sixth Abbasid caliph, son of Harun al-Rashid and Zubaidah.
Al-Ma'mun, (r. 813–833) was an Abbasid caliph, he was well educated and with a considerable interest in scholarship, al-Ma'mun promoted the Translation Movement, he was also an astronomer.
Al-Mu'tasim, (833–842) was an Abbasid caliph, patron of the art and a powerful military leader.
Al-Wathiq, (r. 842–847) was an Abbasid caliph, he was well educated and with a considerable interest in scholarship.
Al-Mutawakkil, (r. 847–861) was the tenth Abbasid caliph, under his reign the Abbasid Empire reached its territorial height.

See also
Banu Hashim
Quraysh
List of Abbasid caliphs
Abbasid Caliphate
Abbasid architecture
Abbasid harem
Ja'alin tribe
Bhishti

References

People of India Uttar Pradesh Volume XLII edited by A. Hasan & J. C. Das page 285
Chisholm, Hugh, ed. (1911). "Bheesty" . Encyclopædia Britannica. 3 (11th ed.). Cambridge University Press. p. 845.

 
 
Abbas
Arab dynasties
Muslim dynasties